Georges Cukierman (11 June 1926 – 17 April 2020) was a French resistant and communist activist. He was the grandfather of French Senator Cécile Cukierman.

Biography
Cukierman joined the Mouvement Jeunes Communistes de France in 1942. After World War II, he worked as a secretary for Frédéric Joliot-Curie, and then a collaborator for Jacques Duclos in Montreuil and Fernande Valignat.

He was President of the Comité pour la mémoire des enfants déportés parce que nés Juifs (CMEDJ), created in 2001 by his wife Raymonde-Rebecca Cukierman.

References

1926 births
2020 deaths
French communists
Members of the Front National (French Resistance) movement